State Center Community College District (SCCCD) is a California Community Colleges System district in Central California, including Fresno City College in Fresno, Reedley College in Reedley, and Clovis Community College in north Fresno, and Madera Community College in Madera. Madera College also maintains a satellite campus, the Oakhurst Community College Center in Oakhurst.

Clovis Community College was formerly the North Center of Reedley College, known as the Willow International Center. Madera Community College was formerly a center of Reedley College.

External links
 Official website

Schools accredited by the Western Association of Schools and Colleges
Universities and colleges in Fresno County, California
California Community Colleges